Chafe (or Tsafe) is a Local Government Area in Zamfara State, Nigeria. Its headquarters is in the town of Chafe at.

It has an area of 1,698 km and a population of 266,008 at the 2006 census.

The postal code of the area is 880.

References

Local Government Areas in Zamfara State